This is the complete list of episodes of the animated series Watch My Chops.

Series overview

Episodes

Season 1 (2003 - 2006)

Season 2 (2014 - 2016)

References

External links
 

Lists of French animated television series episodes